Aphaenogaster kimberleyensis has been discovered and described by Shattuck, S. O. in 2008.

References

kimberleyensis
Insects described in 2008